Barton Street may refer to:

Barton Street (Hamilton, Ontario), in Canada
Barton Street Arena
Barton Street, Gloucester, in England
Barton Street in Lincolnshire, England, an ancient trackway which crossed the River Lud at Louth. 
Barton Street railway station, in Southport, Merseyside, England